Anderson Icefalls is an icefall at the lower end of Pitkevitch Glacier terminating in a cliff face  high, located just southeast of Atkinson Cliffs along the north coast of Victoria Land. Charted in 1911 by Commander Victor Campbell's Northern Party of the British Antarctic Expedition, 1910–13. Named by the British Antarctic Expedition probably for Mr. Anderson of the firm, John Anderson and Sons, Engineers, who owned Lyttelton Foundry, and took great interest in the expedition.

References
 

Icefalls of Antarctica
Landforms of Victoria Land